Now I lay me down to sleep is a classic children's bedtime prayer from the 18th century.

Text
Perhaps the earliest version was written by George Wheler in his 1698 book The Protestant Monastery, which reads:
Upon lying down, and going to ſleep.
Here I lay me down to ſleep.
To thee, O Lord, I give my Soul to keep,
Wake I ever, Or, Wake I never;
To thee O Lord, I give my Soul to keep for ever.

A later version printed in The New England Primer goes:
Now I lay me down to sleep,
I pray the Lord my Soul to keep[;]
If I should die before I 'wake,
I pray the Lord my Soul to take.

Other versions

Now I lay me down to sleep,
I pray my lord my soul to keep,
In the morn when I awake
Please teach me the path of life to take.
Grace Bridges 1932
Now 
I lay me down to sleep, 
I pray the Lord my soul to keep;
His Love to guard me through the night, 
And wake me in the morning's light amen.

Now I lay me down to sleep,
I pray the Lord my soul to keep;
Please angels watch me through the night,
And keep me safe till morning light.

Now I lay me down to sleep,
I pray the Lord my soul to keep;
Angels watch me through the night,
And wake me with the morning light.
Amen

Now I wake to see the light,
As God has kept me through the night;
And now I lift my voice to pray,
That Thou wilt keep me through the day.

It is sometimes combined with the "Black Paternoster", one version of which goes:
Matthew, Mark, Luke and John,
Bless the bed that I lie on.
Four corners to my bed,
Four angels round my head;
One to watch and one to pray
And two to bear my soul away.

In popular culture
 American heavy metal band Megadeth uses this prayer in their song "Go to Hell".
 Final verse of Ron Miller's "Heaven Help Us All," first recorded and released by Stevie Wonder in 1970: "Now I lay me down before I go to sleep/ In a troubled world I pray the Lord to keep/ Keep hatred from the mighty/ And the mighty from the small/ Heaven help us all" 
 American thrash metal band Metallica uses this prayer in the song "Enter Sandman".
 Bob Dylan uses "I pray the Lord my soul to keep" in the song "Roll on John" (2012).
 Rapper Snoop Dogg uses this prayer in his song "Murder Was the Case".
 Rapper Sean Combs uses this prayer in The Notorious B.I.G.'s song "Ready to Die", from his album of the same name.
 Rapper Kid Cudi uses this prayer in the chorus of the song "The Prayer".
 Rapper G-Eazy uses this prayer in his song "Me, Myself & I".
 Blackbear uses the prayer "I pray the Lord my soul to keep" in his song "Do Re Mi"
 Rapper Kendrick Lamar uses the line "If I should die before I wake" in the hook of the song 'The Relevant'
 Rapper XXXTentacion rewrites this prayer in his song "Before I Close My Eyes".
 Singer-songwriter Halsey uses this prayer in the opening lines of the song "Nightmare".
 Record producer Frankie Knuckles uses the prayer in the opening lines of the track "Baby Wants To Ride".
 Rapper JID uses the prayer in the opening verse of his song "Kody Blu 31".
 Singer Jordin Sparks uses the line "If I should die before I wake" as the first lines in her song "No Air".
 American Industrial Rock band Sister Machine Gun uses this prayer in the song "Sins of the Flesh".
 The books in Rachel Vincent's Soul Screamers series are named from the prayer, and deviations thereof.
 In Poltergeist, Carol Anne recites this prayer when she and Diane, Carol Anne's mother, bury her pet canary in their garden.
 In Bad Times at the El Royale, Laramie Seymour Sullivan recites this prayer to his daughter on the phone before bedtime.
 In ‘’Nightmare On Elm Street’’, when Nancy goes to bed to her final battle with Freddy Krueger .
 In Altar Boyz, during La Vida Eternal
 Belgian hardcore DJ DRS uses this prayer in the introduction of his Thunderdome set in 2022.
 JID uses "as I lay me down to sleep, I pray the Lord my soul to keep" in the song "Kody Blu 31" (2022).
 Rapper JPEGMafia uses lines from this prayer in the chorus of his song "the 27 club" from his 2016 album "Black Ben Carson".
 Singer Fletcher references lines from this poem in her song "Girl of my Dreams" from her album of the same name

See also
 
 Adon Olam - a Jewish prayer bearing some similarities

References

Christian prayer
Sleep